Dibang Valley (Pron:/dɪˈbæŋ/) is a district of Arunachal Pradesh named after the Dibang River or the Talon as the Mishmis call it.

History
In June 1980, Dibang Valley district was created out of part of Lohit district. On 16 December 2001, Dibang Valley district was bifurcated into Dibang Valley district and Lower Dibang Valley district.

Geography

The Dibang River originates in the mountains of Arunachal Pradesh and flows through the length of the valley which is named after it. The Dibang has multiple tributaries and only once it debouches into the plains is it called by its name. Some of the major rivers of Dibang Valley District are: Ahui, Emra, Mathun, Dri, Tangon, Ithun, and Ange. The capital of this district, Anini, is the northernmost district capital in Northeast India. This district contains the northernmost point of Northeast India.

Transport
The  proposed Mago-Thingbu to Vijaynagar Arunachal Pradesh Frontier Highway along the McMahon Line, (will intersect with the proposed East-West Industrial Corridor Highway) will pass through this district, alignment map of which can be seen here and here.

Divisions
There is only one Arunachal Pradesh Legislative Assembly constituency in this district- the Anini constituency. It is part of Arunachal East Lok Sabha constituency.

Demographics
According to the 2011 census Dibang Valley district has a population of 7,948, roughly equal to the nation of Nauru. This gives it a ranking of 640th in India (out of a total of 640). The district has a population density of  .With this, it is also the most sparsely populated district in India. Its population growth rate over the decade 2001–2011 was 9.3%. Dibang Valley has a sex ratio of 808 females for every 1000 males, and a literacy rate of 64.8%.

The major population of this district consists of Mishmi (Idu).

The Mishmis have a story narrating the first journeys undertaken in course of migration. The story conveys the names and location of the Cheethu-Huluni or the twelve rivers that the Mishmi (Idu) people came over in the region and settled around. The first accounts of the Mishmi (Idus) are found in the narrations given by the neighboring Ahoms. The Mishmis inhabited the deep jungles of what is now the Dibang valley.

Religion

About 40% of the district's population follows Hinduism. The Mishmi(Idu) people here believes that Rukmini-Chief Consort of Lord Krishna belonged to their tribe. The plays and dances on ‘Rukmini haran’ are  common. There is a legend that 
Lord Krishna asked the Mishmi people to cut their hair as a form of punishment for not allowing him to marry Rukmini. Due to this Idu-Mishmi people are also called "chulikata" (chuli-hair, kata- cut).

Languages
Languages spoken Idu Mishmi with approximately 25000 speakers, written in both Latin and Devanagric scripts.

Flora and fauna
The district is rich in wildlife. Rare mammals such as Mishmi takin, Red goral and Gongshan muntjac occurs while among birds there is the rare Sclater's monal. A flying squirrel, new to science has been recently discovered from this district. It has been named as Mishmi Hills Giant Flying Squirrel Petaurista mishmiensis.

Map

References

External links
Official Website of Dibang Valley District Government

Districts of Arunachal Pradesh
 
1980 establishments in Arunachal Pradesh